The 2017 Tour de Pologne was a road cycling stage race that took place between 29 July and 4 August in Poland. It was the 74th edition of the Tour de Pologne and was the twenty-seventh event of the 2017 UCI World Tour.

Schedule
The race route was announced on 15 May 2017 at the BGŻ Arena in Pruszków.

Participating teams
As the 2017 Tour de Pologne was a UCI World Tour event, all eighteen UCI WorldTeams were invited automatically and obliged to enter a team into the race. Along with a Polish national team, three other squads were given wildcard places into the race, and as such, formed the event's 22-team peloton. The number of riders allowed per squad was seven, down from eight, in 2016; all teams except  (six riders) did so, and therefore the start list contained a total of 153 riders.

Stages

Stage 1
29 July 2017 – Kraków to Kraków, 

The opening stage of the 2017 Tour de Pologne was a ride around Krakow, effectively designed for the sprinters. Having left from the city's Old Square, the peloton completed an anti-clockwise loop around the city, which contained the only two categorised climbs, in the villages of Bachowice and Kaszów, both fourth category. Once the riders returned to Kraków, they first passed the sole intermediate sprint, before completing three laps around a  circuit, to complete the day's running.

Stage 2
30 July 2017 – Tarnowskie Góry to Katowice, 

The second stage was another opportunity for the sprinters. After the start in Tarnowskie Góry, the riders headed south-east, passing through the intermediate sprints in Piekary Śląskie, Chorzów and Siemianowice Śląskie, following devious roads before hitting the  finishing circuit in Katowice. It contained the two category four climbs of the day, and the final metres before the finish line headed slightly downhill, with speeds of about  expected from the top riders.

Stage 3
31 July 2017 – Jaworzno to Szczyrk, 

After the opening two sprint stages, the next stage took the riders into the Silesian Beskids with a route that favoured the climbers. After a reasonably flat first half, the first category Salmopol was climbed, before the riders entered a circuit containing the Zameczek climb, which was climbed twice. Once the riders had descended, they returned over the Salmopol, going in the opposite way from that climbed previously, with the summit coming  before the finish line.

Stage 4
1 August 2017 – Zawiercie to Zabrze, 

Having started in Zawiercie, the first section of the route was hilly, covering the sole categorised climb of the day in Olkusz, where there was also an intermediate sprint, with the other two being in Jastrzębie-Zdrój and Rybnik.

Stage 5
2 August 2017 – Olimp Nagawczyna to Rzeszów, 
The stage started from Olimp Nagawczyna, near Dębica, heading south-east, through the Podkarpackie Voivodeship. The route was hilly throughout, with four categorised climbs all coming in the second half of the section – two ascents in Gmina Lubenia and one in Łany (part of the village Matysówka), before the riders entered Rzeszów, where the only intermediate sprint was held. There, the peloton entered the lengthy  circuit, to be covered once, and containing another ascent of Łany, the summit coming  before the finish.

Stage 6
3 August 2017 – Wieliczka Salt Mine to Zakopane,

Stage 7
4 August 2017 – Terma Bukowina Tatrzańska to Bukowina Tatrzańska,

Classification leadership table
In the 2017 Tour de Pologne, four different jerseys were awarded. The general classification was calculated by adding each cyclist's finishing times on each stage, and allowing time bonuses for the first three finishers at intermediate sprints (three seconds to first, two seconds to second and one second to third) and at the finish of all stages: the stage winner won a ten-second bonus, with six and four seconds for the second and third riders respectively. The leader of the classification received a yellow jersey; it was considered the most important of the 2017 Tour de Pologne, and the winner of the classification was considered the winner of the race.

There was also a mountains classification, the leadership of which was marked by a purple jersey. In the mountains classification, points towards the classification were won by reaching the top of a climb before other cyclists. Each climb was categorised as either first, second, third, or fourth-category, with more points available for the higher-categorised climbs. Double points were also awarded for the premier first-category climb on the final stage.

Additionally, there was a sprints classification, which awarded a white jersey. In the points classification, cyclists received points for finishing in the top 20 in a stage. For winning a stage, a rider earned 20 points, with a point fewer per place down to 1 point for 20th place. The fourth and final jersey represented the active rider classification, marked by a blue jersey. This was decided at the race's intermediate sprints, awarding points on a 3–2–1 scale.

There was also a classification for Polish riders, with the highest-placed rider appearing on the podium each day. As well as this, a teams classification was also calculated, in which the times of the best three cyclists per team on each stage were added together; the leading team at the end of the race was the team with the lowest total time.

References

Sources

External links

2017
2017 UCI World Tour
2017 in Polish sport
July 2017 sports events in Europe
August 2017 sports events in Europe